The orangemouth lizardfish (Saurida flamma) is a species of lizardfish that lives mainly in the Eastern Central Pacific.

Information
Saurida flamma is found in marine environments within a reef-associated area. They are found in a benthic depth range of 5–30 meters within a tropical climate. This species is considered not to be a migratory species. The maximum recorded length of S. flamma as an unsexed male is about 30.5 centimeters or about 12 inches. The diet of the Saurida falmma includes small fishes. This species is native to the areas of Eastern Central Pacific, Hawaii, or Polynesia. They are recorded to be bottom-dwellers that have large appetites. This species serves as no threat or harm to humans. This species is not available or recommended to keep in an aquarium or through the use of commerce.

Common names
The common names from different languages of S. flamma include the following:
Hawaiian : 'Ulae 
English : Orangemouth lizardfish, orangemouth saury, redmouth lizardfish 
Mandarin Chinese : 焰蛇鲻

References

Notes
 

Synodontidae
Fish of Hawaii
Fish described in 1982